Hypotia concatenalis is a species of snout moth in the genus Hypotia. It was described by Julius Lederer in 1858. It was described from Syria but is also found in Russia.

References

Moths described in 1858
Hypotiini